

Places
Saive, Wallonia, district of the municipality of Blegny, Belgium
Saiye, Ghana, also known as Saive

People with the surname Saive
Dieudonné Saive, Belgian arms designer
Jean-Michel Saive
Lambert de Sayve (also spelled Saive and Seave)